This is a list of current and former churches in the Diocese of Pittsburgh. The cathedral church of the diocese is the Cathedral of Saint Paul. The diocese is divided into two administrative vicariates.

North Vicariate

South Vicariate

References

 
Pittsburgh